Total Produce plc was an Irish producer of fresh produce. It was listed on the Irish Stock Exchange and the London Stock Exchange.

History
The company was established by way of a demerger of the fresh produce business of Fyffes in 2006. It secured listings on the Irish Stock Exchange in Dublin and the Alternative Investment Market in London in 2007. It bought a 60% stake in two Dutch fresh produce distributors, Haluco and Nedalpac, in 2008.

In February 2018, Total Produce acquired a 45 percent equity stake in Dole Food Company. For antitrust reasons, Total Produce agreed to divest Saba Fresh Cuts in Sweden and Finland to Bama Gruppen.

On 30 July 2021, Total Produce plc merged with Dole Food Company, Inc under the new name "Dole plc."

Produce
The company's range includes deciduous fruits, tropical fruits, citrus fruits, salads, stone fruits and vegetables.

References

External links
 

Food and drink companies established in 2006
Food companies of the Republic of Ireland
Irish companies established in 2006
Irish companies disestablished in 2021
2021 mergers and acquisitions
Dundalk
Dole plc